The 1922 College Football All-Southern Team consists of college football players chosen by various organizations and writers for College Football All-Southern Teams  for the 1922 Southern Conference football season. It was the first season of the Southern Conference.

Vanderbilt end Lynn Bomar and Georgia Tech running back Red Barron were the only two unanimous choices of a composite of selectors. Walter Camp picked no Southerners for his first-team All-American, but picked Bomar and Barron for his second team.

Composite eleven

The composite All-Southern eleven compiled from twenty four coaches and sporting editors of the South each of whom received trophies from the Atlanta Journal included:
Red Barron, halfback for Georgia Tech, unanimous selection, second-team Camp All-American. Barron led Tech to a 14–6 defeat over one of Auburn's greatest teams. He was also an All-Southern baseball player who played professionally with the Boston Braves; and later coached high school football.
Joe Bennett, tackle for Georgia, later a Coca-Cola executive. "Prior to the 1960s, Bennett is likely Georgia's most outstanding tackle." Both he and Whelchel were notorious kick blockers.
Lynn Bomar, end for Vanderbilt, unanimous selection, second-team Camp All-American. He played with the New York Giants in their inaugural season and was later warden of Tennessee State Prison. Inducted into the College Football Hall of Fame in 1956.
Herb Covington, quarterback for Centre, known as "The Mayfield Flash", had to replace Bo McMillin and kicked a record six straight drop-kicked field goals in a game against Louisville.
Oscar Davis, guard for Georgia Tech, also selected All-American by Lawrence Perry and Billy Evans.
John Fletcher, fullback for Georgia, provided much of the team's offense. An account of the game against Tennessee the next season says "he rammed the ball almost the entire length of the field on two occasions." 
Claire Frye, center for Georgia Tech, had formerly played football as a member of the American Expeditionary Forces.
Red Roberts, end for Centre, last year the fifth southern player selected first-team All-American by Walter Camp. Later coached the Waynesburg Yellow Jackets.
John Shirey, halfback for Auburn, was a member of various all-time Auburn teams.
Albert Staton, tackle for Georgia Tech, is the starting end on the all-time Heisman era team.
Puss Whelchel, guard for Georgia, and the unanimously elected captain from Georgia's strong line of '21. Both he and Bennett were notorious kick blockers.

Composite overview

All-Southerns of 1922

Ends

Lynn Bomar†, Vanderbilt (College Football Hall of Fame) (C, BE, MA, ZN [as t], ED [as t], EH, MB, JP [as t], MM, GHB, BH, HGP, JB [as t], CWA, JH, NOI, NOS, CM, KS, WGF, MT[as t])
Red Roberts, Centre (C, BE, MA, ED [as fb], MB [as g], EH, JP [as g], GHB, BH, HGP, JB, CWA, JH [as t], NOI [as t], NOS [as fb], CM [as t], KS [as t], WGF [as t], MT[as fb])
 John Staton, Georgia Tech (C, BE, ZN, ED, JP)
 Scotty Neill, Vanderbilt (C, BE, ZN, JH, WGF, MT)
Slick Moulton, Auburn (C, BE, MB, NOI, NOS)
 Cliff Lemon, Centre (C, BE, JP, CM)
Tarzan Holt, Tennessee (C, BE, JB, KS)
 Blood Miller, Sewanee (C, MM)
Crook Smith, Mercer (C, MT)
 Edgar David, Oglethorpe (C)
 Terry Snowday, Centre (ED)

Tackles

Al Staton, Georgia Tech (C, BE, MA, ED, MB, HGP, JB, CWA, NOS, MT)
Joe Bennett, Georgia (C, BE, MA, MB, GHB, CWA, JH, WGF)
James Pearce, Auburn (C, BE, MM, GHB, NOI, KS)
Thug Murray, Sewanee (C, BE, BH, HGP)
 Jack Hovater, Alabama (C, ZN, JP)
Tex Bradford, Vanderbilt (C, BE, BH, NOS)
Tex Tilson, VPI (C, BE, CM)
Charles Fenwick, Virginia (C, EH)
Yen Lightsey, Clemson (C)
Martin

Guards

Oscar Davis, Georgia Tech (C, BE, MA [as g], ZN, ED, EH [as t], MB, JP, MM [as t], GHB, BH, HGP, JB, CWA, JH, NOI, NOS, KS, WGF, MT)
Puss Whelchel, Georgia (C, BE, EH, MM, GHB, JH, NOI, NOS)
Rip Reagan, Auburn (C, BE, ED, HGP, JB, CM, MT)
L. O. Wesley, Alabama (C, BE, MM)
Tuck Kelly, Vanderbilt (C, BE, BH)
Birkett Pribble, Kentucky (C, BE, WGF)
Ben Compton, Alabama (C)
Grady Pritchard, North Carolina (C, KS)

Centers
Claire Frye, Georgia Tech (C, BE, ZN [as g], ED, MB, JB, CM [as g])
Ed Kubale, Centre (C, BE, JP, GHB, JH, CM, KS, WGF)
 Shorty Propst, Alabama, (C, BE, MA [as g], ZN, EH [as g], MM, HGP, CWA [as g])
 Eddie Reed, Tulane (C, BE, MA, EH, CWA, NOI, NOS)
 Fats Lawrence, Auburn (C)
 Johnson, Mercer (C, MT)

Quarterbacks
Herb "Flash" Covington, Centre (C, BE, MA, ZN, ED, EH, MB, JP, MM, GHB, BH, HGP, JB, CWA, JH, NOI, NOS, CM, KS, WGF, MT)
Charles Bartlett, Alabama (BE, MM [as hb])
Doc Kuhn, Vanderbilt (BE)
Dick Mulvehill, Georgia (BE)
Jack McDonough, Georgia Tech (BE)

Halfbacks

Red Barron†, Georgia Tech (C, BE, MA, ZN, ED, EH, MB, JP, MM, GHB, BH, HGP, JB, CWA, JH, NOI, NOS, CM, KS, WGF, MT)
John Shirey, Auburn (C, BE, MA, ZN, ED, EH [as fb], MB, JP, MM [as fb], GHB [as fb], BH, HGP, JB, CWA, JH, NOI, NOS, CM, WGF, MT)
Gil Reese, Vanderbilt (BE, GHB)
Ark Newton, Florida (EH, KS)
Jimmy Brewster, Georgia Tech (BE)
G. B. Arnold, Virginia (BE)

Fullbacks
John Fletcher, Georgia (C, BE, MB, BH, HGP, CM)
 Ed Sherling, Auburn (C, BE, MA, ZN, JP, CWA)
Roe Campbell, Tennessee (C, BE, JB, JH, KS, WGF)
Pooley Hubert, Alabama (College Football Hall of Fame) (C)
Red Johnston, North Carolina (C, NOI)
Pinkey Hunt, Georgia Tech (BE)

Key

See also
1922 College Football All-America Team

References

1922 Southern Conference football season
College Football All-Southern Teams